An oneirogen, from the Greek ὄνειρος óneiros meaning "dream" and gen "to create", is a substance or other stimulus which produces or enhances dreamlike states of consciousness. This is characterized by an immersive dream state similar to REM sleep, which can range from realistic to alien or abstract. 

Many dream-enhancing plants such as dream herb (Calea zacatechichi) and African dream herb (Entada rheedii), as well as the hallucinogenic diviner's sage (Salvia divinorum), have been used for thousands of years in a form of divination through dreams, called oneiromancy, in which practitioners seek to receive psychic or prophetic information during dream states. The term oneirogen commonly describes a wide array of psychoactive plants and chemicals ranging from normal dream enhancers to intense dissociative or deliriant drugs.

Effects experienced with the use of oneirogens may include microsleep, hypnagogia, fugue states, rapid eye movement sleep (REM), hypnic jerks, lucid dreams, and out-of-body experiences. Some oneirogenic substances are said to have little to no effect on waking consciousness, and will not exhibit their effects until the user falls into a natural sleep state.

List of oneirogens 
 Calea zacatechichi has been traditionally used in Central America as a believed way to potentiate lucid dreams and perform dream divination. It can promote dreams vivid to the senses, sight, scent, hearing, touch, and taste. May be taken as a tea or smoked.
 Entada rheedii ("African dream bean")
 Mugwort, see Artemisia douglasiana

List of possible oneirogens 
 Amanita muscaria (contains muscimol)
 Amphetamines and other stimulants can create psychotic episodes (called stimulant psychosis) which may be defined as bursts of dream activity erupting spontaneously into waking states; this is not due to the substance itself but rather a result of the prolonged suppression of cholinergic activity and REM sleep due to amphetamine or stimulant abuse.
 Artemisia douglasiana or California mugwort, Douglas's sagewort or dream plant, is a western North American species of aromatic herb in the sunflower family that can be used as a scent, tea, or smoke to trigger vivid and lucid dreams. 
 Artemisia vulgaris
 Wild red asparagus root may promote dreams that involve flying. 
 Atropa belladonna (contains atropine, hyoscyamine, and scopolamine)
 Atropine (via blockade of acetylcholine receptors) 
 Benzatropine
 Datura (contains atropine, hyoscyamine, and scopolamine)
 Dextromethorphan (the main ingredient in many cough syrups) 
 Dimethyltryptamine can trigger intensely vivid and surreal spiritually charged dream states.
 Diphenhydramine ("Benadryl") can invoke an intense hypnagogic REM-like microsleep often indifferentiable from reality. It accomplishes this by blocking various acetylcholine receptors in the brain. 
 Galantamine was shown to increase lucid dreaming by 27% at 4 mg and 42% at 8 mg in a 2018 double-blind study lasting three nights.
 Galanthus (genus) – An alkaloid in the plant is believed to increase the concentration of acetylcholine – a neurotransmitter that plays a very active role in dreaming
 Harmaline 
 Hyoscyamine
 Ibogaine, Ibogamine, and Tabernanthe iboga
 Ilex guayusa can promote vivid dreams and aids in dream recollection.
 Melatonin and Ramelteon may cause vivid dreams as a side effect
 Mirtazapine, paroxetine, and varenicline often cause vivid dreams. 
 MMDA
 Muscimol and other GABA receptor agonists like Zolpidem
 Nutmeg in commonly used amounts myristicin and elemicin, can increase vividness of dreams
 Water lily dried flowers may be smoked, or the rhizomes eaten, to promote vivid dreams. 
 Many opioids may produce a euphoric dream-like state with microsleep, known colloquially as "nodding".
 Peganum harmala (contains harmaline)
 Scopolamine
 Silene undulata ("African dream root") is used by the Xhosa people of South Africa to induce lucid dreams.

Hallucinogenic oneirogens 
 Tabernanthe iboga (iboga) is a perennial rainforest shrub native to West Africa. An evergreen bush indigenous to Gabon, the Democratic Republic of Congo, and the Republic of Congo, it is cultivated across West Africa. In African traditional medicine and rituals, the yellowish root or bark is used to produce hallucinations and near-death outcomes, with some fatalities occurring.
 Psilocybe mushrooms and their active ingredients psilocin and psilocybin
 Salvia divinorum and other Kappa receptor agonists
 Ketamine

Disputed oneirogens 
 Valerian (herb) – A study conducted in the UK in 2001 showed that valerian root significantly improved stress induced insomnia, but as a side effect greatly increased the vividness of dreams. This study concluded that valerian root affects REM due to natural chemicals and essential oils that stimulate serotonin and opioid receptors. Another study found no encephalographic changes in subjects under its influence.

Non-chemical oneirogens 
 Binaural beats can be used to stimulate or trigger dream states, like hypnagogia or rapid eye movement sleep.  
 Mindfulness practices could be useful in achieving lucid dream.
 Sleep deprivation can make dreams more intense, which is caused by REM rebound effect

See also 
 Oneiromancy
 Oneirophrenia

References

Sources

External links

 
Psychedelics, dissociatives and deliriants
Dream